Molykreio is a village and a community in Nafpaktia, Aetolia-Acarnania, Greece. According to the 2011 census, the village had 186 inhabitants and the community, which also includes the villages Ano Platanitis, Fragkaiika and Platanitis, 959.

The village is about 4 km north of Antirrio and the Rio–Antirrio bridge, and 8 km southwest of Nafpaktos.

History

The village Molykreio, which was named Moui Agiou Georgiou before 1919, became part of the municipality of Antirrio in 1989. In 2011, it became part of the municipality of Nafpaktia.

Historical population

References

Populated places in Aetolia-Acarnania
Nafpaktia